Toovey is a surname. Notable people with the surname include:

Alan Toovey (born 1987), Australian rules footballer
Andrew Toovey (born 1962), English composer
Ernest Toovey (1922–2012), Australian cricketer
Geoff Toovey, Australian rugby league player
Shawn Toovey, American actor